Bolshoye Kolesovo is a rural locality (a selo) in Kabansky District, Republic of Buryatia, Russia. The population was 668 as of 2010. There are 12 streets.

Geography 
Bolshoye Kolesovo is located 11 km northwest of Kabansk (the district's administrative centre) by road. Maloye Kolesovo is the nearest rural locality.

References 

Rural localities in Kabansky District